K2 is the highest mountain in Pakistan and the second highest in the world after Everest.

K2 or K-2 may also refer to:

Places
 Mount K2, an ancillary summit of Mount Kitchener in the Canadian Rockies
 K2 is a name for an archaeological in Limpopo state in South Africa which was the largest settlement of the Leopard's Kopje culture, a predecessor to the Kingdom of Mapungubwe.

Arts, entertainment, and media

Films
 K2 (film), a 1991 film about climbing the mountain based on the play of the same name
K2: Siren of the Himalayas (2012), an American documentary film directed by Dave Ohlson

Literature
 K2 (play), a play by Patrick Meyers about climbing the mountain
 List of books about K2

Music

Groups
 K2 (Kovač sisters duo), a Serbian band
 K2 (South African band), a rock band from Bloemfontein
 Kee Marcello's K2, a hard rock band

Albums
 K2 (K2 album) (1995)
 K2 (Kerfuffle album) (2005)
 K2 - Tales of Triumph and Tragedy, a 1988 album by Don Airey

Songs
 "K2", a 1983 song by Tony Banks from The Fugitive
 "K2", a 2017 song by Elbow from Little Fictions

Television
 K2 (TV channel), an Italian television channel
 The K2, a 2016 South Korean television series

Other uses in arts, entertainment, and media
 K2 (board game)
 Kill Me, Kiss Me or K2, a Korean comic series
 K-2SO, a character in the Star Wars movie Rogue One

Brands and enterprises
 Synthetic cannabinoids, which are colloquially known as and commonly sold under the name "K2"
 K2, second model of Larcum Kendall's clocks for navigation
 K2 Sports, a manufacturer of skiing, sliding, and rolling-sports equipment
 K2 Telecom, a mobile network operator in Uganda
 Pentax K2, a camera model related to the Pentax K1000

Disasters on the mountain K2
1986 K2 disaster
1995 K2 disaster
2008 K2 disaster

Military
 K2 (airbase) or Karshi-Khanabad Air Base, an airbase in southeast Uzbekistan, between 2001 and 2005 used by the United States Air Force
 K-2, a circa-1938 airship
 Daewoo K-2, an assault rifle of the Republic of Korea Army
 K2 battlecruiser, a preliminary design in the studies leading up to the G3 battlecruiser
 K2 Black Panther, a Korean main battle tank 
 USS K-2 (SS-33), a 1913 United States Navy K-class submarine
 K2, a K-class sloop of the Royal Netherlands Navy
 Kalinin K-2, Soviet airliner

Science and healthcare
 K2, a mission of the Kepler spacecraft, also known as "Second Light"
 K2, a street name for synthetic cannabinoids
 C/2017 K2, a non-periodic comet
 Haplogroup K2, human group sharing a Y-chromosome characteristic, a.k.a. haplogroup T
 Vitamin K2
 Kardashev-2, a hypothetical civilization that uses all of the energy emitted by a star

Structures
 K2 (building), a residential & commercial building in Leeds, United Kingdom
 K2 Leisure Centre, a sports centre in Crawley, West Sussex

Transportation
 K-2 (Kansas highway)
 K2, a two-seater Sprint kayak
 Eurolot, IATA code K2
 Furness Railway K2, a 4-4-0 steam locomotive class
 LNER Class K2, a class of British steam locomotives 
 GSR Class K2, a class of Irish 2-6-0 steam locomotives
 London Buses route K2, a Transport for London bus route
 PRR K2, a Pennsylvania Railroad locomotive classification
 Tatra K2, a 1966 Czechoslovakian articulated tramcar
 Trekking K2, a French mountain descent paraglider design

Other uses 
 K2 (tax scheme), a Jersey tax avoidance scheme
 K2, a version of the red telephone box in the UK
 K2 League, a Korea league for association football

See also 
 KATU, an ABC affiliate assigned to Portland, Oregon
 KTOO (disambiguation)
 KTWO (disambiguation)